Venus Williams was the defending champion, but lost in the final 1–6, 6–3, 6–4 against Kim Clijsters.

Seeds

Draw

Finals

Top half

Bottom half

External links
 Official results archive (ITF)
 Official results archive (WTA)

2002 WTA Tour